A ghosthunter is a person who engages in ghost hunting, the process of investigating locations that are allegedly haunted.

Ghosthunter(s), Ghost Hunter(s) or Ghost Hunt may also refer to:

Literature
Ghosthunters, a four-book series by German author Cornelia Funke
Ghost Hunter (Paver novel), a 2009 book
The Ghost Hunter (novel series), a series of children's books
Ghost Hunt (novel series), a 1998 light novel involving paranormal investigations, which was later adapted into manga and anime

Fiction
 Ghost Hunter (The Haunted House), a fictional heroic organization in the anime The Haunted House

Film and television

Film 
Ghosthunters (film), a 2016 horror film
Death of a Ghost Hunter, a 2007 horror film
Ghost Hunting (film), a 2017 Palestinian film

Television
Ghosthunters (TV series), a British ghost hunting television series
Ghost Hunters (TV series), an American ghost hunting television series, including spinoffs:
Ghost Hunters International
Ghost Hunters Academy
The Ghost Hunter (TV series), a BBC children's TV series
Ghost Hunt (TV series), a New Zealand reality TV show
"The Ghosthunter", a 1976 episode of The Bionic Woman
The Girly Ghosthunters, a Canadian ghost hunting TV series
BuzzFeed Unsolved: Supernatural, a ghost hunting YouTube series, part of BuzzFeed Unsolved on BuzzFeedBlue

Video games
Ghosthunter (video game), a 2003 PlayStation 2 video game
Ghost Hunter or Kurokishi no Kamen, a 1995 graphic adventure game developed by HummingBirdSoft
Ghost Hunters (video game), a 1986 video game released by Codemasters

See also
Ghostbusters (disambiguation)